Gerard Bancker (sometimes Latin Gerardus, or colloquial Dutch Gerrit) (14 February 1740 in Albany, New York – January 1799) was an American surveyor and politician.

Life
Bancker was the son of Gerard Bancker Sr. and Maria de Peyster, who had married in New York City in 1731. He was the grandson of Johannes de Peyster (1666–1719), the 23rd Mayor of New York City between 1698 and 1699, and great-grandson of Johannes de Peyster, Sr., the Huguenot first settler of the De Peyster family in North America.

Bancker was elected to the American Philosophical Society in 1772, and in 1774, as city surveyor, he made a map of St. George's Ferry on Nassau Island.

He was Deputy Treasurer from 1776 to 1778, and New York State Treasurer from 1778 to 1798.

He collected a large number of broadsides from the revolutionary era which were sold at auction in 1898 in Philadelphia.

Notes

Sources
Political Graveyard
The New York Civil List compiled by Franklin Benjamin Hough (page 35; Weed, Parsons and Co., 1858) (Google Books)

1740 births
1799 deaths
New York State Treasurers
De Peyster family
Politicians from New York City
American art collectors
American surveyors
American cartographers